Robert B. Nicol is a Canadian curler from Thunder Bay, Ontario.

Awards
Canadian Curling Hall of Fame: 1988
Northwestern Ontario Sports Hall of Fame: 1988

Teams

References

External links
 
 Bob Nichol – Curling Canada Stats Archive

Living people
Canadian male curlers
Curlers from Northern Ontario
World curling champions
Brier champions
Curlers from Thunder Bay
Year of birth missing (living people)